An intermediate school district (ISD) in the state of Michigan is a government agency usually organized at the county or multi-county level that assists a local school district in providing programs and services. The following table lists every Intermediate school district in Michigan.

 For local education agency (LEA) districts, which include public schools, see list of local education agency districts in Michigan.
 For public school academy (PSA) districts, which include charter schools, see list of public school academy districts in Michigan.

References 

 
 intermediate
Intermediate
Michigan